Saint-Germain-en-Laye is the main railway station serving Saint-Germain-en-Laye, France. The station opened on 14 August 1847 with the opening of the ligne de Saint Germain (from Paris to Saint-Germain), an atmospheric railway. Twelve years later, conventional locomotives replaced the atmospheric powered engines. The original station had a large veranda building above the terminating lines.

Réseau Express Régional stations
Railway stations in France opened in 1847
Railway stations in Yvelines